William Edward Smalley (born April 8, 1940) was the eighth bishop of the Episcopal Diocese of Kansas from 1989 to 2003.

Biography 
Smalley was born on April 8, 1940 in New Brunswick, New Jersey, the son of August H. Smalley and Emma Gleason. After attending public schools in New Jersey and Pennsylvania, he studied at Lehigh University where he graduated with a Bachelor of Arts in 1962, and then the Episcopal Divinity School where he earned his Master of Divinity in 1965. He also graduated with a Master of Education from Temple University in 1970, and a Doctor of Ministry from the Wesley Theological Seminary in 1987.  

Smalley was ordained to deacon in June 1965 by the Bishop Frederick J. Warnecke of Bethlehem, and then priest on March 5, 1966 by the same prelate. He served as vicar of St Peter's Church in Plymouth, Pennsylvania, and vicar of St Martin-in-the-Fields Church in Nuangola, Pennsylvania, between 1965 and 1967. From 1967 to 1980 Smalley served in a variety of roles, including two years as rector of All Saints Church in Lehighton, Pennsylvania, and then as Federal Program Coordinator for the Lehighton Area School District. He returned as rector of All Saints and worked to develop a cluster ministry. Prior to his election, he was serving as rector of Ascension Church in Gaithersburg, Maryland. He was consecrated on December 8, 1989 at Grace Cathedral by Presiding Bishop Edmond L. Browning.   He retired on December 31, 2003, and served for six months at St Philip’s Church in Topeka, Kansas.

See also
List of bishops of the Episcopal Church in the United States of America

References

Episcopal Clerical Directory 2015

1940 births
Living people
Episcopal Church in Kansas
Episcopal bishops of Kansas
Lehigh University alumni
Temple University alumni
Episcopal Divinity School alumni